The 1997–98 All-Ireland Senior Club Hurling Championship was the 28th staging of the All-Ireland Senior Club Hurling Championship, an inter-county knockout competition for Ireland's top championship clubs representing each county.  The championship was won by Birr of Offaly, who beat Sarsfield's of Galway by 1–13 to 0–9 in the final.

Results

Connacht Senior Club Hurling Championship

First round

Second round

Semi-final

Final

Leinster Senior Club Hurling Championship

First round

Quarter-finals

Semi-finals

Final

Munster Senior Club Hurling Championship

Quarter-finals

Semi-finals

Final

Ulster Senior Club Hurling Championship

Semi-finals

Final

All-Ireland Senior Club Hurling Championship

Quarter-final

Semi-final

Final

Championship Statistics

Scoring

Top scorers overall

Top scorers in a single game

References

1997 in hurling
1998 in hurling
All-Ireland Senior Club Hurling Championship